Sir Reginald St George Smallridge Bond  (10 April 1872 – 27 July 1955) was a British medical doctor and Royal Navy administrator.  He was Medical Director-General of the Royal Navy, 1931–1934; and Honorary Physician to the King at the same time.

References 

1872 births
1955 deaths
19th-century English medical doctors
20th-century English medical doctors
Knights Commander of the Order of the Bath
Fellows of the Royal College of Physicians